Cicolluis or Cicoluis (also known as Cicollus, Cicolus, Cicollui, and Cichol) is a god in Celtic mythology worshiped by the ancient Gauls and having a parallel in Ireland.

Name 
The Gaulish theonym Cicollu(i)s derives from the stem cico-, itself from Proto-Celtic *kīko-, meaning 'meat, flesh, muscle' (cf. Old Breton cic-, Middle Welsh cig 'meat') and, by metonymy, 'breast' (cf. Middle Irish cích). It could be translated as 'Big-Muscle' or 'Great-Breast'.

Cult 
In the Gallo-Roman religion, Cicolluis is thought to be a common epithet for Gaulish Mars. A Latin dedicatory inscription from Narbonne (which was in the far south of Gaul), France, bears the words MARTI CICOLLUI ET LITAVI (“Mars Cicolluis and Litavis”)., “Mars Cicolluis” has dedications in Xanten, Germany, and Aignay-le-Duc (where his consort is given as Litavis) and Mâlain (where his consorts are given as Litavis and Bellona, Roman goddess and personification of war) of the Côte-d'Or, France. “Cicolluis” is named alone (not as an epithet of Mars) in an inscription at Chassey, Côte-d'Or, Franche-Comté, France, and a partial inscription from Ruffey-lès-Echirey, Côte-d'Or, France, may be dedicated to Cicolluis. In Windisch, Switzerland, he is known as “Cicollus,” and in Dijon, Côte-d'Or, France, he is known as Mars Cicoluis.

Cicolluis may also be compared to Cichol or Cíocal Gricenchos, the earliest-mentioned leader of the Fomorians or Fomóiri (the semi-divine initial inhabitants of Ireland) in Irish mythology. According to the seventeenth-century Irish historian Seathrún Céitinn (also known by the English name Geoffrey Keating), Cichol arrived in Ireland with fifty men and fifty women on six boats a hundred years after the Flood. There, his people lived on fish and fowl for two hundred years until Partholón and his people (who brought the plough and oxen) invaded and defeated the Fomorians in the Battle of Magh Ithe.

References

Bibliography

External links
A section of the Lebor Gabála Érenn relating to Ciccul Gricenchoss and its translation into English by Jonathan Slocum, Patrizia de Bernardo Stempel, and Caren Esser
Etymological translations of “Cicolluis,” “Cicollus,” “Cicos,” etc. by Patrick Cuadrado (in French); automatic Google translation into English

Gaulish gods
Tutelary deities
War gods